Nédélec is a township municipality in western Quebec, Canada, in the Témiscamingue Regional County Municipality.

Name
The name of the municipality recalls the name of Jean-Marie Nédélec who was an oblate and a missionary with the Algonquins in the region. His last name is from the Breton word Nedeleg which means Christmas.

History
By 1895, a general store was supplying the many logging camps of the area. The first permanent settlers arrived in 1909, the same year the township and township municipality were formed. They were both named after Jean-Marie Nédélec (1834-1896) who was a missionary among the Algonquin First Nations of Lake Timiskaming and Lake Abitibi from 1867 to 1869 and from 1892 to 1896.

On October 7, 1995, the unorganized territory of Roulier, named after Ulric Roulier who was priest at Nédélec in the mid-1930s, was added to the municipality.

Demographics 

Population trend:
 Population in 2016: 356 (2011 to 2016 population change: -11.7%)
 Population in 2011: 403 (2006 to 2011 population change: -3.1%)
 Population in 2006: 416
 Population in 2001: 429
 Population in 1996: 474
 Population in 1991: 524

Mother tongue:
 English as first language: 4.2%
 French as first language: 93.0%
 English and French as first language: 0%
 Other as first language: 1.4%

See also
 List of township municipalities in Quebec

References

Township municipalities in Quebec
Incorporated places in Abitibi-Témiscamingue
Témiscamingue Regional County Municipality